Azari & III (pronounced "Azari and Third") was a Canadian music group, formed in 2008, which performed house, electronic and dance music. They released their self-titled debut album in 2011 and earned recognition on the dance music scene with the hits "Hungry for the Power" and "Reckless (With Your Love)".

History
Dinamo Azari, Fritz Helder, Alixander III (Alphonse Lanza) and Starving Yet Full (Cedric Gasaida) met at a karaoke bar "while dancing to Donna Summer". They formed Azari & III in 2007 and, in 2009, released their first single, "Hungry for the Power". The "Hungry for the Power" video was considered too controversial by YouTube, which removed it from its website for several weeks. That single was followed by "Reckless (With Your Love)", which drew the attention of Canadian DJ, producer and musician Tiga. In 2010, Azari & III collaborated with Friendly Fires on a track "Stay Here" and released solo singles "Indigo" and "Into the Night".

In August 2011, the band released a new single, "Manic", alongside their debut album Azari & III, which charted at number 13 on the UK Dance Albums Chart. "Hungry for the Power" and "Reckless (With Your Love)" were re-released, and the band appeared at a number of festivals, including Glastonbury and Lovebox in the United Kingdom, and Sónar in Spain. 

The singles "Hungry for the Power", "Manic" and "Reckless (With Your Love)" placed at positions 2, 7 and 121 respectively in the 2011 year-end list of the German Club Charts. Azari & III also contributed remixes for artists like Robyn and Cut Copy. In February 2012, their debut album was re-released in Europe and the band continued to perform for the rest of the year, including appearances at festivals Southside and Hurricane in Germany, Hove in Norway, Exit in Serbia and Sziget in Hungary. Azari & III also performed again at the Lovebox Festival in London, headlining the Dalston Superstore Live stage. The single "Into the Night" was re-released, along with a new video; that was followed by the release of a new single, "Lost in Time". "Reckless (With Your Love)" placed at number 3 in the 2012 year-end list of the German Club Charts. Azari & III was nominated for a Polaris Music Prize in 2012.

In 2013, the band released Remix Album 2013 and the single "Indigo Remixes". Also in 2013, they released another remix album, Body Language Vol. 13, which is remixes of other artists' songs. 

In November 2013, Alixander III posted on his Facebook page that the band was splitting, saying that the project had run its course.

In 2015, the Toronto label Idol Hanse gathered unreleased and loose songs and released a new album by Azari & III, Rarities From Extremities. It was long-listed for the 2016 Polaris Music Prize.

Band members
 Dinamo Azari (Christian Philip Maxwell Farley) – producer, musician
 Alixander III (Alphonse Lanza III) – producer, musician
 Starving Yet Full (Cédric Gasaida) – vocalist
 Fritz Helder (Fritz Helder) – vocalist

Discography

Studio albums
 2011: Azari & III, Loose Lips Records
 2015: Rarities From Extremities, Idol Hanse

Remix and DJ mix albums
 2012: FACT Mix 313, Fact Magazine
 2013: Remix Album 2013, Turbo Recordings, Dim Mak Records
 2013: Body Language Vol. 13, Get Physical Music

EPs & Singles
 2009: "Hungry for the Power", I'm A Cliché 
 2009: "Reckless (With Your Love)", Permanent Vacation 
 2010: "Indigo", Turbo Recordings 
 2010: "Into the Night", Scion Audio/Visual 
 2011: "Manic", Turbo Recordings
 2012: "Lost in Time", Loose Lips Records
 2013: "The Lost Versions", Turbo Recordings
 2013: "Indigo Remixes", Dim Mak Records
 2013: "Lost Express", Get Physical Music
 2015: "No Way Back" (with MixHell), Trax Records

References

External links
 Azari & III at Twitter
 Azari & III at YouTube

Canadian dance music groups
Canadian electronic music groups
Canadian house music groups
Musical groups disestablished in 2013
Musical groups established in 2008
Musical groups from Toronto
Musical quartets
Nu-disco musicians
2008 establishments in Ontario
2013 disestablishments in Ontario